The 40th International 500-Mile Sweepstakes was held at the Indianapolis Motor Speedway on Wednesday, May 30, 1956. The event was part of the 1956 USAC National Championship Trail and was also race 3 of  8 in the 1956 World Championship of Drivers.

The 1956 race was the first to be governed by the United States Automobile Club. AAA withdrew from auto racing the previous August. Another change would have a more immediate effect on the current race. The track had been paved over with asphalt with only about 600 yards of the main stretch still remaining brick.

The 1956 race is also known in Indy 500 lore as "Cagle's Miracle." Torrential rains pummeled the Speedway in the days leading up to the race. The track was full of standing water, access tunnels were completely flooded, and the infield was a muddy quagmire. The conditions threatened to postpone or outright cancel the race. Speedway superintendent Clarence Cagle supervised a massive cleanup effort, in which hundreds of thousands of gallons of water were pumped out of the tunnels and the infield. Cagle and his crew worked non-stop for 48 hours straight, some without sleep, and had the track ready just in time for race morning.

Time trials
Time trials was scheduled for four days, but the third day was rained out. With the new surface, a new track record was expected. The second weekend saw heavy rain that completely canceled Saturday and left only a small window on Sunday for 4 drivers to fill the field. Nino Farina was one of the drivers left out when he didn't get a chance to qualify his Bardahl-Ferrari.

Saturday May 19 – Pole Day time trials
Sunday May 20 – Second day time trials
Saturday May 26 – Third day time trials (rained out)
Sunday May 27 – Fourth day time trials

Race summary
The early part of the race turned into a three-man duel between Russo, O'Connor, and Flaherty. Russo was the first to retire when his tire failed and his car crashed and caught fire. At quarter distance due to yellows and the pit stops, Parsons took the lead followed by Freeland. By the  mark Flaherty took over the lead followed by Freeland, Sweikert, and Parsons but Hanks was working his way through the fields after sustaining some damage in the Russo crash, eventually taking second. Flaherty had built up such a lead that he was able to make his last pit stop and remain in front. He crossed the finish line with Hanks the only other car on the lead lap. The only real change in the top cars toward the end was both O'Connor and Jim Rathmann having to drop back with mechanical problems while both drivers were in the top 5.

Box score 

Notes
 – 1 point for fastest lead lap

Alternates
First alternate: Eddie Sachs  (#58)

Failed to Qualify

Jay Abney  (#87)
George Amick  (#33) - Entry declined, failed physical
Johnny Baldwin (R) (#91)
Tony Bonadies  (#25)
Buddy Cagle  (#81) - Wrecked rookie test
Bill Cheesbourg  (#84, #87)
Jimmy Davies (#31)
Len Duncan (#51)
Edgar Elder  (#41) - Did not finish rookie test
Giuseppe Farina  (#9)
Elmer George  (#78)
Johnny Kay  (#35)
Danny Kladis (#91)
Mike Magill  (#74)
Ernie McCoy
Jim McWithey  (#77)
Earl Motter  (#9, #41)
Duke Nalon (#31)
Roy Newman  (#74)
Cal Niday
Marvin Pifer  (#75)
Dickie Reese  (#87)
Eddie Russo (#10, #27, #33)
Gig Stephens  (#85)
Len Sutton  (#62)
Marshall Teague (#3, #47)
Shorty Templeman (#46)
Leroy Warriner  (#93)
Chuck Weyant (#22)
Dempsey Wilson  (#22, #79)

Race notes 
 Pole position: Pat Flaherty – 4:07.26 (time over four laps)
 Fastest Lead Lap: Paul Russo – 1:02.32
 Shared Drive: Car# 10: Ed Elisian 123 laps and Eddie Russo 37 laps
 Race winner Pat Flaherty was the last driver to win the 500 wearing a t-shirt. All subsequent winners have worn flame retardant uniforms.

Broadcasting

Radio
The race was carried live on the IMS Radio Network. Sid Collins served as chief announcer. The broadcast was carried by over 280 affiliates, as well as Armed Forces Radio. The broadcast came on-air at 10:45 a.m. local time, fifteen minutes prior to the start of the race. This was the final broadcast based out of the old wooden Pagoda, which was demolished after the race.

This was also the final year to have only two turn reporters ("south turns" and "north turns"). Beginning in 1957, the crew would be expanded to have one reporter in each of the four turns.

Championship standings after the race 
World Drivers' Championship standings

Note: Only the top five positions are included.

See also
 1956 USAC Championship Car season

Gallery

References

External links
Indianapolis 500 History: Race & All-Time Stats – Official Site
Van Camp's Pork & Beans Presents: Great Moments From the Indy 500 – Fleetwood Sounds, 1975
1956 Indianapolis 500 at RacingReference.info (Relief driver statistics)

Indianapolis 500
Indianapolis 500
Indianapolis 500 races
Indianapolis 500
Indianapolis 500
Indianapolis 500